Syssphinx montana is a moth of the family Saturniidae. It is found in Mexico and (rarely) in southeastern Arizona.

The males are smaller than the females. Adults are on wing from mid-July to early August. Adults do not feed.

The larvae feed on Haematoxylon brasalita, Cassia emarginata, Acacia farnesiana, Gleditsia triacanthos and Robinia pseudoacacia. The coloration and shape of the larvae seem to be influenced by the food plant.

References

Moths described in 1905
Saturniidae